The gross domestic product (GDP) of the counties of Albania varies from one county to another as the economic development of Albania varies between the country's geographic regions reflecting historic developments, infrastructure available, especially routes of transportation, and diverse geographic setting of various parts of the country.

County nominal GDP per capita

References

Counties By Gdp
 
Albanian Counties By Gdp
Albania